The method of loci is a strategy for memory enhancement, which uses visualizations of familiar spatial environments in order to enhance the recall of information. The method of loci is also known as the memory journey, memory palace, journey method, memory spaces, or mind palace technique. This method is a mnemonic device  adopted in ancient Roman and Greek rhetorical treatises (in the anonymous Rhetorica ad Herennium, Cicero's De Oratore, and Quintilian's Institutio Oratoria). Many memory contest champions report using this technique to recall faces, digits, and lists of words.

The term is most often found in specialised works on psychology, neurobiology, and memory, though it was used in the same general way at least as early as the first half of the nineteenth century in works on rhetoric, logic, and philosophy. John O'Keefe and Lynn Nadel refer to:... "the method of loci", an imaginal technique known to the ancient Greeks and Romans and described by Yates (1966) in her book The Art of Memory as well as by Luria (1969). In this technique the subject memorizes the layout of some building, or the arrangement of shops on a street, or any geographical entity which is composed of a number of discrete loci. When desiring to remember a set of items the subject 'walks' through these loci in their imagination and commits an item to each one by forming an image between the item and any feature of that locus. Retrieval of items is achieved by 'walking' through the loci, allowing the latter to activate the desired items. The efficacy of this technique has been well established (Ross and Lawrence 1968, Crovitz 1969, 1971, Briggs, Hawkins and Crovitz 1970, Lea 1975), as is the minimal interference seen with its use.

The items to be remembered in this mnemonic system are mentally associated with specific physical locations.  The method relies on memorized spatial relationships to establish order and recollect memorial content. It is also known as the "Journey Method", used for storing lists of related items, or the "Roman Room" technique, which is most effective for storing unrelated information.

Contemporary usage
Many effective memorisers today resort to the "method of loci" to some degree. Contemporary memory competition, in particular the World Memory Championship, was initiated in 1991 and the first United States championship was held in 1997. Part of the competition requires committing to memory and recalling a sequence of digits, two-digit numbers, alphabetic letters, or playing cards. In a simple method of doing this, contestants, using various strategies well before competing, commit to long-term memory a unique vivid image associated with each item. They have also committed to long-term memory a familiar route with firmly established stop-points or loci. Then in the competition they need only deposit the image that they have associated with each item at the loci. To recall, they retrace the route, "stop" at each locus, and "observe" the image. They then translate this back to the associated item. For example, Ed Cooke, a Grand Master of Memory, describes to Josh Foer in his book Moonwalking with Einstein how he uses the method of loci. First, he describes a very familiar location where he can clearly remember many different smaller locations like his sink in his childhood home or his dog's bed. Cooke also advises that the more outlandish and vulgar the symbol used to memorize the material, the more likely it will stick.

Memory champions elaborate on this by combining images. Eight-time World Memory Champion Dominic O'Brien uses this technique. The 2006 World Memory Champion, Clemens Mayer, used a 300-point-long journey through his house for his world record in "number half marathon", memorising 1040 random digits in a half-hour. An anonymous individual has used the method of loci to memorise pi to over 65,536 (216) digits.

The technique is taught as a metacognitive technique in learning-to-learn courses. It is generally applied to encoding the key ideas of a subject. Two approaches are:
 Link the key ideas of a subject and then deep-learn those key ideas in relation to each other, and
 Think through the key ideas of a subject in depth, re-arrange the ideas in relation to an argument, then link the ideas to loci in good order.

The method of loci has also been shown to help those with depression remember positive, self-affirming memories.

A study at the University of Maryland evaluated participants' ability to accurately recall two sets of familiar faces, using a traditional desktop, and with a head-mounted display. The study was designed to utilize the method of loci technique, with virtual environments resembling memory palaces. The study found an 8.8% recall improvement in favor of the head-mounted display, in part due to participants being able to employ their vestibular and proprioceptive sensations.

Method 
The Rhetorica ad Herennium and most other sources recommend that the method of loci should be integrated with other forms of elaborative encoding (i.e., adding visual, auditory, or other details) to strengthen memory. However, due to the strength of spatial memory, simply mentally placing objects in real or imagined locations without further elaboration can be effective for simple associations.

A variation of the "method of loci" involves creating imaginary locations (houses, palaces, roads, and cities) to which the same procedure is applied. It is accepted that there is a greater cost involved in the initial setup, but thereafter the performance is in line with the standard loci method. The purported advantage is to create towns and cities that each represent a topic or an area of study, thus offering an efficient filing of the information and an easy path for the regular review necessary for long-term memory storage.

Something that is likely a reference to the "method of loci" techniques survives to this day in the common English phrases "in the first place", "in the second place", and so forth.

The technique is also used for second-language vocabulary learning, as polyglot Timothy Doner described in his 2014 TED talk.

Applicability of the term
The designation is not used with strict consistency. In some cases it refers broadly to what is otherwise known as the art of memory, the origins of which are related, according to tradition, in the story of Simonides of Ceos and the collapsing banquet hall. For example, after relating the story of how Simonides relied on remembered seating arrangements to call to mind the faces of recently deceased guests, Stephen M. Kosslyn remarks "[t]his insight led to the development of a technique the Greeks called the method of loci, which is a systematic way of improving one's memory by using imagery." Skoyles and Sagan indicate that "an ancient technique of memorization called Method of Loci, by which memories are referenced directly onto spatial maps" originated with the story of Simonides. Referring to mnemonic methods, Verlee Williams mentions, "One such strategy is the 'loci' method, which was developed by Simonides, a Greek poet of the fifth and sixth centuries BC." Loftus cites the foundation story of Simonides (more or less taken from Frances Yates) and describes some of the most basic aspects of the use of space in the art of memory. She states, "This particular mnemonic technique has come to be called the "method of loci". While place or position certainly figured prominently in ancient mnemonic techniques, no designation equivalent to "method of loci" was used exclusively to refer to mnemonic schemes relying upon space for organization.

In other cases the designation is generally consistent, but more specific: "The Method of Loci is a Mnemonic Device involving the creation of a Visual Map of one's house."

This term can be misleading: the ancient principles and techniques of the art of memory, hastily glossed in some of the works, cited above, depended equally upon images and places. The designator "method of loci" does not convey the equal weight placed on both elements. Training in the art or arts of memory as a whole, as attested in classical antiquity, was far more inclusive and comprehensive in the treatment of this subject.

Spatial mnemonics and specific brain activation 

Brain scans of "superior memorizers", 90% of whom use the method of loci technique, have shown that it involves activation of regions of the brain involved in spatial awareness, such as the medial parietal cortex, retrosplenial cortex, and the right posterior hippocampus. The medial parietal cortex is most associated with encoding and retrieving of information. Patients who have medial parietal cortex damage have trouble linking landmarks with certain locations; many of these patients are unable to give or follow directions and often get lost. The retrosplenial cortex is also linked to memory and navigation.  In one study on the effects of selective granular retrosplenial cortex lesions in rats, the researcher found that damage to the retrosplenial cortex led to impaired spatial learning abilities. Rats with damage to this area failed to recall which areas of the maze they had already visited, rarely explored different arms of the maze, almost never recalled the maze in future trials, and took longer to reach the end of the maze, as compared to rats with a fully working retrosplenial cortex.

In a classic study in cognitive neuroscience, O'Keefe and Nadel proposed "that the hippocampus is the core of a neural memory system providing an objective spatial framework within which the items and events of an organism's experience are located and interrelated." This theory has generated considerable debate and further experiment. It has been noted that "[t]he hippocampus underpins our ability to navigate, to form and recollect memories, and to imagine future experiences. How activity across millions of hippocampal neurons supports these functions is a fundamental question in neuroscience, wherein the size, sparseness, and organization of the hippocampal neural code are debated."

In a more recent study, memory champions during resting periods did not exhibit specific regional brain differences, but distributed functional brain network connectivity changes compared to control subjects. When volunteers trained use of the method of loci for six weeks, the training-induced changes in brain connectivity were similar to the brain network organization that distinguished memory champions from controls.

Fictional portrayals 

 Fictional portrayals of the method of loci extend as far back as ancient Greek myths.
 In the novels Hannibal (1999) and Hannibal Rising (2006), by Thomas Harris, a detailed description of Hannibal Lecter's memory palace is provided.
We catch up to him as the swift slippers of his mind pass from the foyer into the Great Hall of the Seasons. The palace is built according to the rules discovered by Simonides of Ceos and elaborated by Cicero four hundred years later; it is airy, high-ceilinged, furnished with objects and tableaux that are vivid, striking, sometimes shocking and absurd, and often beautiful. The displays are well spaced and well lighted like those of a great museum. [...] On the floor before the painting is this tableau, life-sized in painted marble.
A parade in Arlington National Cemetery led by Jesus, thirty three, driving a '27 Model-T Ford truck, a "tin lizzie", with J. Edgar Hoover standing in the truck bed wearing a tutu and waving to an unseen crowd. Marching behind him is Clarice Starling carrying a .308 Enfield rifle at shoulder arms.
 In the first episode of Bordertown (2016), detective Kari Sorjonen explains the memory palace concept, and, throughout the series, he marks rectangles with tape on his basement floor where he stands to imagine himself at various significant loci in a case, organized into memory palaces.
 The television series The Mentalist, which premiered in late 2008, mentions memory palaces on multiple occasions. The main character Patrick Jane claims to use a memory palace to memorise cards and gamble successfully. In the eleventh episode of season two, Jane teaches his colleague Wayne Rigsby how to construct a memory palace, explaining that they are good for memorising large chunks of information at a time.
 In the 2003 film Dreamcatcher, the character Jonesy has an elaborate memory palace which plays a major role in the plot and is shown several times in the film, depicted as a physical building that Jonesy is walking through as a way to represent him accessing the memories.
 In the BBC television series Sherlock, which premiered in 2010, the title character uses mind palaces to remember various things throughout the show.
 In Hilary Mantel's 2009 novel, Wolf Hall, the fictionalized version of Thomas Cromwell describes "memory palace" techniques and his uses of it.
 In the 2019 video game The Sinking City, the main character Charles Winfield is a detective that keeps points of interest in a mind palace menu.
 In the 2020 video game Twin Mirror, the main character Sam Higgs uses the mind palace in various points of the game to relive memories and investigate.

See also
Spatial memory

Notes

References

 Dann, Jack (1995) The Memory Cathedral: A Secret History of Leonardo da Vinci: Bantam Books 0553378570
 
 Mnemonic Training Reshapes Brain Networks to Support Superior Memory, Neuron, 8 March 2017.
 

Mnemonics
Dialectic
Rhetoric
Learning methods
Conceptual models
Cognitive training
Spatial cognition